KMXW (92.5 FM), also known as "Max 92.5" is a radio station broadcasting a Top 40 (CHR) format. The station previously broadcast a country music format, and was known as "New Country 92.5" under the call letters KDAD. Before that, it was known as "Buckin' Country". Licensed to Bar Nunn, Wyoming, United States, the station is currently owned by Robert D. Breck, Jr., through licensee Breck Media Group Wyoming, Inc. It was formerly licensed to Douglas, Wyoming.

History
The station was assigned the call letters KBOG on April 7, 2005.  On February 13, 2006, the station changed its call sign to KDAD. It most recently changed its call sign to KMXW. On November 9, 2006, the station was sold to White Park Broadcasting, and on June 19, 2009, it was sold to the Casper Radio Group. Effective May 13, 2016, KDAD and sister stations KTED and KZQL were sold to Breck Media Group Wyoming, Inc. for $963,000.

Programming
The station airs the weekly top 30 countdown show The Daly Download with Carson Daly, hosted by Carson Daly.

References

External links

MXW
Contemporary hit radio stations in the United States
Natrona County, Wyoming
Radio stations established in 2009
2009 establishments in Wyoming